During the 18th Canadian Parliament, two women sat in the House of Commons for the first time. Sixteen women ran for seats in the Canadian House of Commons in the 1935 federal election. Agnes Macphail, first elected in 1921, was reelected in the newly created riding of Grey—Bruce. Martha Black, running in the place of her sick husband George Black as an independent Conservative, was elected for the Yukon riding, becoming the second woman to be elected to the House of Commons. Cairine Wilson and Iva Campbell Fallis continued to sit as members of the Senate.

Party Standings

Members of the House of Commons

Senators

References 

Lists of women politicians in Canada